Harold Ellsworth Ely (December 26, 1909 – July 12, 1983) was an American football tackle who played three seasons in the National Football League with the Chicago Bears and Brooklyn Dodgers. He played college football at the University of Iowa and attended Theodore Roosevelt High School in Des Moines, Iowa.

Professional career

Chicago Bears
Ely played in six games, starting one, for the Chicago Bears during the 1932 season. In November 1932, he was said to have been the heaviest pro football player at the time, weighing 275 pounds. A New York Times article from November 2, 1932, also said that he wore the number #275 on his jersey.

Brooklyn Dodgers
Ely played in 24 games, starting twenty, for the Brooklyn Dodgers from 1932 to 1934.

References

External links
Just Sports Stats

1909 births
1983 deaths
Players of American football from Des Moines, Iowa
American football tackles
Iowa Hawkeyes football players
Chicago Bears players
Brooklyn Dodgers (NFL) players
Theodore Roosevelt High School (Iowa) alumni